Carphina sigillata is a species of longhorn beetles of the subfamily Lamiinae. It was described by Monne in 1985, and is known from northwestern Brazil.

References

Beetles described in 1985
Carphina